The 1996 Marlboro Masters of Formula 3 was the sixth Masters of Formula 3 race held at Circuit Park Zandvoort on 4 August 1996. It was won by Kurt Mollekens, for Alan Docking Racing.

Drivers and teams

Classification

Qualifying

Race

1. - Müller withdrew from the race after qualifying, and thus, de Galzain was allowed to race.

References

Masters of Formula Three
Masters of Formula Three
Masters of Formula Three
Masters of Formula Three